Johann Ludwig Joseph, Graf von Cobenzl (21 November 1753 – 22 February 1809) was a diplomat and politician of the Habsburg monarchy.

Von Cobenzl was born in Brussels in 1753 as one out of ten children to Count Johann Karl Philipp von Cobenzl (1712–1770), the plenipotentiary minister of the Empress Maria Theresia in the Austrian Netherlands. His brother in law, François de la Woestyne, 3rd Marquess of Becelaere was executed by Guillotine in Cambrai. He also was a cousin of the diplomat Philipp Graf von Cobenzl, and a protégé of Wenzel Anton von Kaunitz. In 1779, he became minister at St. Petersburg.

In 1795, during the Third Partition of Poland, he negotiated a large portion of land for the Habsburgy Monarchy that had gone empty in the Second Partition.

In 1800, he conducted negotiations in Paris to end the War of the Second Coalition. Unaware of the Armistice of Treviso signed a week earlier, he surrendered Mantua to the French on 26 January 1801. He signed the Treaty of Lunéville on 9 February. In 1801, he became foreign minister of the Habsburg Monarchy. As such, he recognized the imperial title of Napoleon. In 1805, the Austrian Empire took part in the War of the Third Coalition, and was defeated at the Battle of Austerlitz, which led to Cobenzl's dismissal.

Cobenzl was a member of the Illuminati under the name of Arrian. He died, aged 55, in Vienna.

References

External links
Cobenzl, Ludwig (ADB), at deutsche-biographie.de (in German)
Cobenzl at viaf.org

1753 births
1809 deaths
18th-century Austrian people
Austrian diplomats
Austrian expatriates in Belgium
Carniolan nobility
Counts of Austria
Austrian Empire politicians
Foreign ministers of Austria
Politicians from Brussels